Manchester School District is a school district headquartered in Manchester, New Hampshire.

It is the largest school district in the state, according to the Associated Press.

History
Circa 2003 Hooksett contracted with Manchester to educate its high school students. It was intended to last until 2023.

Previously Bedford had an agreement with the district so that students were sent to Manchester West High School. Beginning in fall 2007 Bedford stopped sending new students to Manchester West, so it could instead send them to Bedford High School. By fall 2009 Bedford no longer sent any levels to Manchester West.

In 2011, the town of Auburn, which previously contracted with Manchester School District and sent the majority of its students to Manchester Memorial High School, voted to change its high school to Pinkerton Academy in Derry, with 1,119 in favor and 190 opposing. In 2011 some Auburn students already chose to go to Pinkerton.

By 2013 the relationship between Hooksett and the Manchester district collapsed, with each side alleging the other violated terms of the agreement. In July 2013 Hooksett and the Manchester district agreed to end their contract early. In October 2013 426 high school students who lived in Hooksett attended Manchester school district schools.

In 2016 the voters in the town of Candia voted to change their high school from Manchester Central High School to Pinkerton Academy, effective 2018, which meant no longer sending high school students to the Manchester School District. The votes were 1,090 in favor and 113 against.

In 2019 John Goldhardt became superintendent. He resigned in February 2022 despite initially planning to do so circa 2024.

Demographics
 the district has a large number of English as a second language students due to a program of the U.S. State Department placing refugees in Manchester.

Schools

High schools
 Manchester High School Central
 Manchester Memorial High School
 Manchester West High School
 Manchester School of Technology

Middle schools
 Hillside Middle School
 Henry J. McLaughlin Middle School
 Parkside Middle School
 Southside Middle School

Elementary schools
 Bakersville 
 Beech Street
 Gossler Park
 Green Acres
 Highland-Goffe’s Falls
 Jewett Street
 McDonough
 Northwest
 Parker-Varney
 Smyth Road
 Webster
 Weston
 Wilson

 Former 
 Hallsville Elementary School - The building was made of brick and was three floors tall. In 1891 the cornerstone of the school was placed. In February 2021 the superintendent recommended closing this school so the school district could save money as the district was projected to have a budget deficit of $7,400,000. It closed in June of that year.

References

External links
 Manchester School District
Manchester, New Hampshire
School districts in New Hampshire
Education in Hillsborough County, New Hampshire
Education in Rockingham County, New Hampshire
Education in Merrimack County, New Hampshire